The Vuelta a Cundinamarca is a road cycling race held annually in the Cundinamarca Department of Colombia.

The race was first held in 1974, when it was known as the Clásica de Cundinamarca. It was renamed the Vuelta a Cundinamarca in 1996.

A women's race, the Vuelta a Cundinamarca Femenina, was created in 2010.

Winners

Men

Women

Notes

References

Cycle races in Colombia
Recurring sporting events established in 1974
Men's road bicycle races